Jasbinder Singh "Jas" Mann (Punjabi: ਜਸਵਿੰਦਰ ਸਿੰਘ ਮੱਨ, born 24 April 1971) is a British songwriter, musician, singer, record producer and film producer. He was lead singer of Babylon Zoo, known for their 1996 UK chart-topping single "Spaceman" and No. 6 album The Boy with the X-Ray Eyes.

Early life
He was born in 1971, Dudley, West Midlands, England, to a Punjabi Indian father and a mother of Sioux descent. Mann formed his first band at the age of 15, with his friend Adam Toussaint; they were called The Glove Puppets. Mann personally funded a 7" vinyl single, sold through local record shops in 1987.

The Sandkings, another Wolverhampton band, enlisted Mann as their vocalist in 1988. The group, named after a 1981 collection of sci-fi short stories by George R. R. Martin, released seven singles and an EP with Mann between 1988 and 1992 as well as an album. They scored three Top 10 hits in the UK indie single chart.

The Sandkings were the opening act for Happy Mondays and The Stone Roses in the early 1990s, but Mann left the band because of creative differences.

Babylon Zoo

The single "Spaceman" charted at No. 1 in the UK Singles Chart, in January 1996 after appearing on a Levi's commercial, selling 420,000 copies in its first week. It became the fastest selling single in the United Kingdom in over thirty years, since The Beatles' "Can't Buy Me Love". "Spaceman" became a number one chart hit in 23 countries, including the United Kingdom. As of November 2012, "Spaceman" was the 74th best selling single in the history of the United Kingdom, selling 1.14 million copies. Critic Jon Savage wrote, "Staring into the cameras, as sexy/strange as Mick Jagger in 1965, Mann cast the nation under his spell."

An album entitled The Boy with the X-Ray Eyes was produced at Mann's New Atlantis Productions music/artwork/video centre. It was released in 1996 and peaked at No. 6 in the UK Albums Chart The following two singles charted in the UK top 40: "Animal Army" (No. 17) and "The Boy with the X-Ray Eyes" (No. 32). Three years later, in 1999, a follow-up album was released entitled King Kong Groover. Neither the album nor its single, "All the Money's Gone", were top 40 entries.

After "Spaceman"
In 2004, Mann staged a competition in which he asked fans to sum up their lives in one word, which he would then write into the song lyrics of his new album. In 2005, he announced he would be issuing the new Babylon Zoo album, Cold Clockwork Doll, although this has yet to be released.

In 2008 Mann co-founded the Indomina Group, an independent studio based in Los Angeles and the Dominican Republic, as well as Pinewood Indomina Studios in the Dominican Republic. Mann sold his ownership to the Vicini Group after an investment from the IFC, and Indomina shut its US office to relocate full operations to the Dominican Republic. Indomina distributed the 2012 films The Imposter (2012) and A Fantastic Fear of Everything.

Mann is also a board member of the children's charity International Child Art Foundation, providing arts programming in schools.

In 2013 Mann co-founded Virgin Produced India, a film production company in partnership with the Virgin Group.

References

External links
 

1971 births
Living people
English male singers
English record producers
English rock musicians
People from Dudley
musicians from Wolverhampton
People of Sioux descent
English people of Indian descent
English people of Native American descent
English people of Punjabi descent
Musicians from the West Midlands (county)
21st-century English singers
21st-century British male singers